Khédafi Djelkhir, or sometimes Khesafi Djelkhir, (born 26 October 1983) is a French featherweight amateur boxer of Algerian origin. He qualified for the 2008 Summer Olympics and won a silver medal at the 2004 European Championships.

Career
Djelkhir won a silver medal at featherweight at the 2004 European Amateur Boxing Championships in Pula, Croatia losing to Vitali Tajbert.

He participated in the 2004 Summer Olympics. There, he was defeated in the second round of the featherweight (57 kg) division again by Germany's eventual bronze medalist Vitali Tajbert.

Djelkhir qualified for the Olympics 2008 by beating English boxer Stephen Smith in the semi final of a European qualifying tournament.
At the Olympics he reached the finals where he lost to Ukrainian southpaw Vasyl Lomachenko.

Olympic Games
2004 (featherweight)
Defeated Saifeddine Nejmaoui (Tunisia) 38-13
Lost to Vitali Tajbert (Germany) 26-40

2008 (featherweight)
Defeated Paul Fleming (Australia) 13-9
Defeated Raynell Williams (United States) 9-7
Defeated Arturo Santos Reyes (Mexico) 14-9
Defeated Shahin Imranov (Azerbaijan) Retired at the end of the 1st round with an arm injury, with Imranov leading 5-2.
Defeated by Vasyl Lomachenko (Ukraine) 9–1 RSC 1 (2:51)

World Championships
2005 (featherweight)
Lost to Mehrullah Lassi (Pakistan) 12-38

2007 (featherweight)
Lost to Raynell Williams (United States) 18-28

References

External links
 
 
 Yahoo! Sports

1983 births
Living people
Featherweight boxers
Boxers at the 2004 Summer Olympics
Boxers at the 2008 Summer Olympics
Olympic boxers of France
Olympic silver medalists for France
French sportspeople of Algerian descent
Sportspeople from Besançon
Olympic medalists in boxing
Medalists at the 2008 Summer Olympics
French male boxers